Asclepi is a heavily eroded lunar impact crater that lies in the rugged southern highlands of the Moon. The outer rim has been worn down and rounded by many millions of years of subsequent impacts, so that it is now nearly level with the surrounding terrain. As a result, the crater is now little more than a depression in the surface. The interior is nearly flat and relatively featureless.

The rim of Asclepi is marked only by a small crater across the western rim, and several tiny craterlets. The satellite crater Hommel K is a more recent impact that is attached to the southeast rim. This is a bowl-shaped formation with a sharp edge and a small central floor.

Nearby craters of note include Pitiscus to the north-northeast, Hommel due east, and Baco to the northwest. To the west-southwest is the smaller crater Tannerus.

Satellite craters
By convention these features are identified on lunar maps by placing the letter on the side of the crater midpoint that is closest to Asclepi.

References

External links
 

Impact craters on the Moon